Searle is a surname. Notable people with the surname include:

 Adam Searle, Australian politician, member of the New South Wales Legislative Council since 2011
 Berni Searle (born 1964), South African photographer and installation artist
 Catherine Searle, American mathematician
 Charles Edward Searle, British academic, Vice-Chancellor of Cambridge University 1888–89
 Damon Searle (born 1971), Welsh footballer
 David Searle (born 1936), retired Canadian politician and lawyer
 Frank Searle (businessman) (1874-1948), Chief Engineer of the London General Omnibus Company
 Frank Searle (photographer) (1921–2005), British photographer of the Loch Ness Monster
 George Frederick Charles Searle (1864–1954), British physicist
 George Mary Searle (1839–1918), American astronomer
 Greg Searle (born 1972), British Olympic rower, brother of Jonny Searle
 Helen Searle (1834–1884), American painter
 Henry Ernest Searle (1866–1899), Australian professional sculler
 Humphrey Searle (1915–1982), British composer
 James Searle (c. 1730–1797), American merchant
 Janie Searle (1897–1969), New Zealand Salvation Army officer and community leader
 John Searle (born 1932), American philosopher, famous for work on consciousness and for his speech act theory
 Jonny Searle (born 1969), British Olympic rower, brother of Greg Searle
 J. Clinton Searle (1889–1952), American politician and lawyer
 Ken Searle (born 1951), Australian artist
 Leonard Searle (1930–2010), American astronomer
 Michael Searle, Australian rugby league football personality
 Robert Searle, English pirate of the mid-17th century
 Rod Searle (1920–2014), American politician
 Ron Searle, Canadian mayor from 1976 to 1978
 Ronald Searle (1920–2011), British artist, sculptor, medallist and cartoonist
 Ryan Searle (born 1989), Australian baseball player
 Ryan Searle (darts player) (born 1987), British darts player
 Shayle R. Searle, American statistician
 William George Searle, 19th-century British historian

See also
 Justice Searle (disambiguation)
 Searles (disambiguation)

English-language surnames

de:Searle